Dorothy Spinner is a fictional character created by Paul Kupperberg, appearing in American comic books published by DC Comics. She was a former member of the Doom Patrol with the ability to bring imaginary beings to life. She first appeared in Doom Patrol vol. 2, #14 (November 1988) as a background character until she was made a full member a few issues later.

Dorothy made her first live adaptation in the second and third seasons of the Doom Patrol television series on DC Universe and HBO Max streaming services portrayed by Abi Monterey.

Publication history
Dorothy Spinner first appeared in issue #14 of the second volume of the series Doom Patrol. Her name is an in-joke referring to Dorothy Gale and how she arrived in Oz, by a tornado, or spinning wind. Also, in her first appearance and in her appearances on the covers of the Doom Patrol graphic novels, Dorothy is dressed like Dorothy Gale.

Dorothy's facial deformity changes from mild to severe depending on who's drawing her and how it's done.

Fictional character biography
Dorothy Spinner's mother gave her up for adoption when Dorothy was a baby. She was adopted by a Midwestern couple. Dorothy suffered a facial deformity that gave her the appearance of an ape, complete with hairy arms. Because of this, Dorothy grew up isolated from society, with only her imaginary friends for company. She eventually discovered that she had the power to bring these "friends" to life. Her imaginary friends even taught her how to read and write, since she wasn't allowed to go to school because people thought that she would "scare" the other children.

Dorothy's psychological vulnerability made her the perfect target for the Candlemaker, a malignant egregore, removed from the physical plane of existence eons ago, who sought to come back through Dorothy's psychic ability. One day, a group of boys had been brutally teasing Dorothy. The Candlemaker appeared in her mind, and when she wished that one of the boys was dead, he happily obliged. The next day, they found the boy disemboweled and crucified in a field. Dorothy would spend the rest of her life blocking the Candlemaker in the deepest part of her mind.

Kupperberg run
Dorothy's first comic appearance was in Doom Patrol (vol. 2) #14, when the Doom Patrol was swallowed by a Chaos Lord named Pythia. This happened near Dorothy's home and when she went to investigate the energy bursts and discovered her favorite super team fighting a monster, she was swallowed by Pythia as well. Inside, she thought she witnessed most of the Doom Patrol killed with the exception of Celsius, who used her meditative learnings to keep her focused on the chaotic illusion, and Powergirl, who held Arani's (Celsius) hand in the maelstrom, but it was Dorothy who pelted Pythia with rocks, which caused her pain and brought back the dead team to life and destroyed Pythia. Dorothy would turn up again in issue #18 for Celsius' funeral.

Morrison run
Starting with the Grant Morrison run of the Doom Patrol, Dorothy became a member. Her first prominent feature as a member was in issue #25, which dealt with Dorothy's first period and the Materioptikon, an old device used by former JLA villain Doctor Destiny.

The device boosted Dorothy's powers and brought back three of her old imaginary friends, Damn All, Darling-Come-Home, and Flying Robert (nightmarish representations of her neglectful and abusive family), whom she killed with an imaginary gun.

The Ant Farm and the Telephone Avatar
During the Men from N.O.W.H.E.R.E. and Pentagon saga, Dorothy was on Danny the Street (a living genderqueer street) with Josh and Flex Mentallo (The Man of Muscle Mystery) when she's kidnapped by the government-run Men from N.O.W.H.E.R.E. She was taken to the sub-sub basement of the Pentagon called the Ant Farm, a mechanical monstrosity and prison.

Strung up alongside kidnapped psychic Wallace Sage, who created Flex, they were going to be used to summon the Telephone Avatar, an all-powerful being made up of telephone parts. In Dorothy's mind, the Candlemaker appeared once more and promised that if she let him out for good, he would destroy the Men from N.O.W.H.E.R.E. and the Telephone Avatar. Dorothy lapsed, and when she woke up the Candlemaker held true to his promise.

Brief Candles
Following their departure from the Ant Farm, the Candlemaker began to haunt Dorothy's mind trying to get her to let him out. Dorothy confessed to Josh what had been bothering her and about what the Candlemaker had done in the past. She then collapsed from the strain he was putting on her mind, and when Josh tried to find Chief and the head of the Doom Patrol for help, he was shot by him. When Dorothy found Josh's body, the Candlemaker told her that he would bring back Josh to life if she let him out. She did so, and Josh was brought back to life, only to be killed seconds later.

The Candlemaker proceeded to behead the Chief and destroy Cliff Steele's human brain to use his artificial body. But Cliff's brain was copied onto a floppy disk and inserted into a blank robot body by Willoughby Kipling, who helped the Doom Patrol during the Cult of the Unwritten Book saga. Danny the Street took Cliff, Dorothy, and Willoughby to a burning and chaotic New York City.

Only children, lunatics, and those sensitive to the astral plane could see what the Candlemaker was doing to the city. He was destroying the world's soul, or anima mundi, instead of the world itself. This was causing people to go insane. Kipling used one of his occult devices, a wind-up toy, to track down the Candlemaker to a skyscraper where people were being thrown out of windows and onto the pavement.

They were joined by Crazy Jane and Rebis, two other Doom Patrolers. Jane had multiple personalities, each with a different power, and Rebis was a radioactive hermaphrodite containing a negative spirit called the Anegima Regis. Rebis had just gone through their reproductive cycle, and Jane's alternate personalities were now powerless. The Candlemaker killed Rebis and tossed Crazy Jane into a vortex to what he called "Hell", which turned out to be our world. He followed the Doom Patrol on Danny the Street, while Cliff, enraged at the loss of Jane, continued to try to kill him. The Candlemaker ripped him to pieces, right after Danny had taken them to the home of Will Magnus, creator of the superhero team of robots called the Metal Men.

Will sent forth one of his new robots, Tungsten, as a diversion. Danny took them back to the Doom Patrol headquarters and then started traveling to different places in the world with the Candlemaker still on him as a way to disorient him, but he appeared back at headquarters, on fire and screaming.

Dorothy used a gun on the Candlemaker but to no effect, but at that moment, computer-programmed nanomachines that the Chief had created to cover the world, swarmed him. He still went after Dorothy, but she screamed "Why don't you shut up?! Everyone's sick of you!". Then, Kipling came in with the egg that Rebis had created, which hatched into Rebis' new body. It attacked the Candlemaker, who was reduced to a single flame that Dorothy extinguished.

Meanwhile, the nanomachines that the Chief had created planned to swarm the world and create a global catastrophe if they weren't stopped. Cliff integrated his brain with Caulder's computer and proceeded to shut them down. Danny then expanded into an entire world, and Cliff, Jane, and Rebis decided to stay there. Dorothy refused though and asked a red balloon to take her into the real world.

Pollack run
Dorothy was one of the characters left over from Grant Morrison's run of the series used by Rachel Pollack.

Sliding in the wreckage
After the Doom Patrol disbanded, Dorothy began living by herself in an apartment building, where she began being vexed by African spirits who continually bothered her. These spirits wanted Dorothy to come live in their world, but she refused them because she wanted to live in the real world. One day, longing for the life she once had, she had a party with her imaginary friends, including imaginary versions of Cliff, the Chief, and Joshua, when she was again bothered by the spirits. Afterward, she was visited by Will Magnus, who convinced her that she needed to return to the human race instead of locking herself away with her imaginary friends. On a trip to the mall, Dorothy was attacked again, this time being saved by Cliff.

Dorothy returned to the Doom Patrol headquarters, where she and Will tried to help Cliff, whose fully robotic brain began to malfunction. At the same time, the Chief's head was being placed in a cryogenic state, but he was simultaneously appearing in a land of shapeshifters called the Teiresias. His arrival in that world began causing fits of craziness and strangeness in the world. This called the attention of a government organization called the Builders, similar in nature to the Men from N.O.W.H.E.R.E. Seeing the Doom Patrol as the cause of the craziness, they attacked Doom Patrol headquarters.

As Dorothy, Will, and Cliff were being attacked, one of the Teiresias presented Dorothy with a blank, human brain to be given to Cliff. She then re-awakened the Chief, who could now survive as a severed head due to the Teiresias. Dorothy then rejoined the Doom Patrol with Cliff and the Chief after the Builders were taken care of.

Moving out of their former headquarters, the three moved to Violet Valley's Rainbow Estates, an unfinished planned community whose construction was halted due to the recession. There, Dorothy discovered a living doll whom she named Charlie, who was made up of a teddy bear's body and a ventriloquist dummy's head. She began to regress to the same mental state as at the beginning of Morrison's run.

Arcudi run
In Doom Patrol vol. 3 (2001), Dorothy is comatose and on life support. She imagines Robotman, who takes form and leads a new version of the Doom Patrol until the real Robotman discovers him and traces him back to Dorothy. At the end of the series, he consents for Dorothy to be removed from life support.

DC Rebirth
In "DC Rebirth", Dorothy's history remains intact in the Doom Patrol comics. Robotman is still affected by Dorothy's death and keeps a picture of her with the Doom Patrol with him. However, she appeared in the DC Pride2022 event at a Pride parade alongside Kate and Danny the Brick.

Powers and abilities
Dorothy's power enables her to bring imaginary beings to life. These beings can survive as long as Dorothy is alive. In one case, a false Cliff Steele disappeared when he realized what he was, though Darling-Come-Home was perfectly aware of her imaginary status and seemed to function fine. These imaginary friends can be good or bad, and don't have to like Dorothy. This power can also bring about beings who were removed from this plane of being such as the Candlemaker.

Her imaginary friends
The list of her imaginary friends is as follows:
 Damn All - Made of a newspaper crossword puzzle and financial reports with multiple eyes and a big smile.
 Darling-Come-Home - Wears an apron and has the head of a lightbulb's picture. Damn All's wife.
 Flying Robert - A ghost baby balloon thing. Damn All's son. A reference to a poem in Der Struwwelpeter by Heinrich Hoffmann.
 The Inky Boys - Three people made up of ink. Another reference to Der Struwwelpeter, specifically the poem 'Die Geschichte von den schwarzen Buben'.
 Pretty Miss Dot - Has lipstick fingers, a helmet over her head covered with lips and curlers, a sweater with a big "D" on it, and shoes that have skulls stitched into them.
 Vegans - Three rhyming girls in tribal masks with deer legs who can-can.
 Paddle the Sky - A dark swirling mass of hands with paddles.
 Dark as the Morning - A shadowy, eyeless smoke being with a mouth filled with fangs.
 Heart-of-Ice - A blue skinned woman made of ice. Can make ice.
 A false Robotman - Thought he was the real Robotman.
 Jolly Hangar - Made up of coat hangers.
 A false Joshua Clay - Complete with chest wound and rotting flesh.
 A false Niles Caulder
 Honey Pie - Made up of a beehive with branches for arms and legs and a honey pot for a head.
 Spinner - Spinner was actually a member of the Doom Force, a one-shot special that Grant Morrison wrote which was a cross between the Doom Patrol and X-Force. She appeared in the imaginary version of the Doom Patrol Dorothy summoned to protect her.
 Polly Polly Tinker Boy
 Cowboy Doll Bookface -a being with a book for a face and a body made of dolls. Wears a cowboy hat and boots. Wields two guns.
 Rockabye Baby - A baby made of rocks that throws rocks.
 Baby Twig Lady - A young girl covered in leaves and twigs, use leaves as a weapon.
 All-The-Time-In-The-World - Has spoons for arms and a globe with clocks for eyes for a head. Wears a crown and a dress.
 Moonface Lightfoot - A two legged smiling crescent moon.
 The Candlemaker - Not actually one of her imaginary friends, but actually has an external existence as an egregore/gestalt being, with a candelabra for a head; it is the world's fear of nuclear holocaust.

In other media
Dorothy makes a cameo appearance in the Batman: The Brave and the Bold episode "The Last Patrol!" as one of the attractions at a freak show. She is shown on a poster with the word "Spinner" written across it.

Dorothy Spinner is featured in the Doom Patrol television series, where she is primarily portrayed by Abigail Monterey throughout the second season and an unknown actress at the end of the previous season. In the series, Dorothy is depicted as the daughter of the Chief and a primitive woman named Slava, with her physical appearance resulting from her heritage instead of a facial deformity. Dorothy's connection to the Chief motivates him to cause the tragedies that create the Doom Patrol, hoping to extend his life to protect her. Dorothy later repaired the brick form of Danny the Street and gave it a new form. Her "friend" the Candlemaker serves as the season's primary antagonist, telling Dorothy to let him out. She is usually able to suppress him, but when Jane's alter "Baby Doll" kills Dorothy's imaginary friend Manny she allows the Candlemaker to kill Baby Doll and Flaming Katy (another alter) in retaliation, though she is later guilt ridden over it. The Candlemaker eventually gains access to reality and incapacitates the Doom Patrol. Slava encourages Dorothy to embrace her destiny and face the Candlemaker. The season ends with Dorothy creating a weapon of her own and summoning the Candlemaker, who then drags her away for a showdown.

Dorothy's imaginary friends also appear with Darling-Come-Home portrayed by Vanessa Cater and voiced by Kat Cressida, Candlemaker voiced by Lex Lang, and the giant spider Herschel voiced by Brian T. Stevenson. Her other imaginary friend Manny doesn't speak.

References

DC Comics female superheroes
DC Comics superheroes
Characters created by Erik Larsen
Characters created by Paul Kupperberg
Superheroes who are adopted
Comics characters introduced in 1988
DC Comics metahumans